The Bombala River, a perennial river of the Snowy River catchment, is located in the Monaro region of New South Wales, Australia.

Course and features
The Bombala River rises within the Kybeyan Range, part of the Great Dividing Range, on the southwestern slopes of Brown Mountain. The river descends  over its  course.

In its upper reaches, the Bombala River is crossed by the Snowy Mountains Highway near Brown Mountain; while the Monaro Highway crosses the meandering river at several locations north of Bombala.

The name of the river is derived from the Aboriginal word meaning "meeting of the water", presumably referring to the confluence of the Bombala River with the Coolumbooka River, at Bombala; and the confluence with the Undowah River, a few kilometers upstream.

See also

 Rivers of New South Wales
 List of rivers of New South Wales (A–K)
 List of rivers of Australia

References

Rivers of New South Wales